

Final rounds

The final rounds were held as a single elimination knockout, with the losers of the semi-finals playing off for the bronze medals. Scoring was up to 15.

Pool matches

Preliminary rounds were held on a round robin basis in two pools of 6 fencers. The top four qualifiers from each pool took a quarterfinal place, and pool matches were scored up to five points.